CAK7 is the Transport Canada location identifier for Vancouver (Children & Women's Health Centre) Heliport shared by:

B.C. Women's Hospital & Health Centre
British Columbia's Children's Hospital